Fella may refer to:

People
 Fella El Djazairia, stage name of Algerian singer, pianist and performer Fella Ababsa (born 1961)
 Fella Makafui (born 1995), Ghanaian actress
 Edward Fella (born 1938), American graphic designer, artist and educator
 Giuseppe Fella (born 1993), Italian footballer

Other uses
 Fella-Werke, a German agricultural machine manufacturer 
 Fellach, also called Fella, a river of Bavaria, Germany
 Fella (river), a river near Tarvisio, Friuli Venezia Giulia, Italy
 "Fella", the official deviantArt mascot
 Fella, a 2018 album by Danheim

See also
 Feller (disambiguation)
 Fellow (disambiguation)
 NAFO (group)